James Njenga Karume (1929 – 24 February 2012) was a Kenyan businessman and politician. He was born in Elementaita, Nakuru District.

Early life 

Njenga Karume was born in 1929 on Lord Delamare's Soysambu ranch in Elementaita. He was the eldest of 8 children to Joseph Karume (later changed to Karogo) and Teresia Njeri Karogo who were indentured servants working for colonial white settlers.
Njenga's amiable personality was always curious and deep. He had a very strong relationship with his grandfather whom he spent most of his childhood days with.

Education

Unfortunately, there were no schools for Africans in Elementaita. Because of that Njenga had to go to school in Ndeiya, Limuru at a school called as Kahuho-Karing'a Primary school, at the beginning of 1942. Keen on pursuing further education, Njenga proceeded to Riara in Kiambu after 3 years at Kahuho, but not before being baptised. Even as Njenga pursued education back in Central Kenya, his parents moved to Elburgon and settled in Marioson Forest in 1944. He later joined them.

As expected in the Kikuyu culture Njenga had reached the age at which he was expected to undergo circumcision. He was then admitted to the (njata) STAR age group in 1947. Now considered a full grown man, equipped with some formal education and eager to fend for himself, Njenga decided to start his life and moved back to Rift Valley closer to his parents.

Business 
Karume's first exposure to business was while he was in school. He began buying and selling books, pencils and other school stationery from a wholesale shop outside the school and resell to his fellow students in school. In his book he claims to have put the school tuck shop out of business.

After his education Karume managed to get employment doing clerical work on a farm. A few days before beginning work when he attended a rally between the white farm owners and the workers. In the heat of a debate Njenga managed to ask a question which upset the whites. This saw him lose his job. It is from then on he decided not to be employed.

He then started trading in charcoal. He had asked his friend the late John Njenga to join him but he flatly refused claiming that it is dirty work and he is too educated to do such business. He continued on his own. He then began saving what he earned in the charcoal business to finance his timber business.

Karume held a diploma in business management from Jeans School (KIA). While Kenya was still under colonial rule, he formed a wholesale shop on Grogan Road (now Kirinyaga Road) in Nairobi. It was one of the few shops in Kenya operated by indigenous people.

Later he operated the Nararashi Distributors, which distributed the products of the Kenya Breweries Limited (KBL). Later Castle Brewing Kenya Limited, a Kenyan subsidiary of South African Breweries (SAB) was formed, with Karume appointed its director. Karume himself sought to distribute the products of both companies, but KBL was afraid of the competition and cancelled the distribution contract with Karume. Karume took the case to the court stating the cancellation of the contract was unfounded. The High Court first ordered KBL to pay KSh 231 million in damages (about US$2.9 million), but upon appeal the decision was overturned and Karume was told to pay KBL for the suit. As a result, Karume suffered severe financial hurt. He continued to distribute Castle Beer for a while until SAB left Kenya, finally ending his transport business. Before his death his empire was valued at close to $200 million and includes the Jacaranda Group of Hotels under Jacaranda Holdings Limited, Karume Holdings Limited and Cianda Holdings Limited. His empire is diversified into three main areas – hospitality, real estate and agriculture.

Politics 
Karume joined politics in 1974 as a nominated Member of Parliament and in the three subsequent elections held in 1979, 1983 and 1988 Karume vied for and won the Kiambaa constituency seat. Between 1979 and 1988 he served as an assistant minister.

Karume was an active figure in the G.e.m.a. association. While Jomo Kenyatta was still the Kenyan president, in 1976, Karume joined number of other politicians including Kihika Kimani and Paul Ngei forming the "Change the Constitution Movement" attempting to change the Constitution of Kenya such that then Vice-president Daniel arap Moi would not inherit the presidency upon Kenyatta's death. This was to prevent a non-Kikuyu president. The movement did not last long. Attorney-General Charles Njonjo charged Karume and other leader of the movement with treason, as "they had imagined the death of the sitting president", which was forbidden by the Penal Code. President Kenyatta dropped the charges, but at the same time silenced the movement.

At the National Delegates Conference in Kasarani in mid-1991 Karume moved a motion to repeal Section 2A of the Kenyan Constitution – that is, restoration of the multi-party system. President Moi accepted the motion.

Karume was reluctant to join the leading opposition force Forum for the Restoration of Democracy (FORD), foreseeing its split. Instead, he formed the Democratic Party (DP) with Mwai Kibaki and John Keen on 31 December 1991. At the 1992 elections Karume ran on a DP ticket, but lost his seat to Kamau Icharia of FORD–Asili, whose presidential candidate Kenneth Matiba enjoyed higher popularity in his constituency.

He regained the parliamentary seat at the 1997 elections running again on DP ticket. For the 2002 Election he won the seat again, but now on KANU ticket, supporting their presidential candidate Uhuru Kenyatta, despite the long-standing friendship with Karume and presidential candidate Kibaki.

He won the seat also at the 2002 elections. In December 2006, when he was appointed the Minister of Defence. At the 2007 election he represented the PNU coalition led by President Kibaki, but lost the seat to Stanley Munga Githunguri of KANU.

In 2009 he released an autobiography titled 'Beyond Expectations: From Charcoal to Gold'.

Personal life 

He met his first wife Maryanne Wariara Njenga née Waireri in 1951. In 1952 they got married and had ten children Dr. Wanjiku Kahiu, The late Joseph Karume Njenga, Teresia Njeri Karume, Lucy Wanjiru Karume, The Late Jane Mukuhi Matu Nee Karume, Henry Waireri Karume, The late Kennedy Njoroge Karume, Albert Kigera Karume, Samuel Wanjema Karume.

He also married a second wife Margret Njeri Njenga in 1960 upon advice from his father in law that having two wives would help look after his empire.

On 21 February 2006, he married Grace Njoki and the couple had Emmanuel Karume Njenga.

Karume was also a personal friend and key political advisor to Kenyan presidents Jomo Kenyatta, Mwai Kibaki and Uhuru Kenyatta

Death and legacy

Karume had been having medical problems from late November 2011. He had been taken for chemotherapy treatment in India and returned on 1 January 2012 and was undergoing chemotherapy at the Aga Khan Hospital. He was preparing to go to Israel for further treatment but a few days before leaving he developed an infection. He was admitted to the Karen Hospital on 17 February 2012 in poor health and as the week went on his condition deteriorated. In the early hours of the morning on 24 February 2012, Njenga Karume was pronounced dead due to a cardiac arrest. He died days after his close friend and political ally John Michuki.

Before he died he had formed the Njenga Karume Trust which was designed to manage his inheritance. A board of trustees was chosen to manage these interests and it was led by George Ngugi Waireri as the chairman who is brother-in-law and managing director or Standsand (Africa) Limited, a tea exporting company. Margaret Ndete his sister and who owns a successful chain of supermarkets, named Kamindi Selfridges, James Raymond Njenga who is his cousin and a retired businessman, his oldest living son Henry Waireri Karume who is a successful entrepreneur in the construction and supplies business, Kungu Gatabaki a long time friend and is currently a chairman for Letshego he also appointed his Wife Grace Njoki Njenga as an overseer over his trust.

References 

Investment News Kenya, 14 December 2009: For Kenyan Business Tycoon, Njenga Karume, Honesty Starts Right on the Cover of his Biography

1929 births
2012 deaths
Kenyan businesspeople
Democratic Party (Kenya) politicians
Party of National Unity (Kenya) politicians
Members of the National Assembly (Kenya)
Government ministers of Kenya
Elders of the Order of the Golden Heart of Kenya
Defense ministers of Kenya